The 2021 Southland Conference women's soccer tournament, the postseason women's soccer tournament for the Southland Conference, was held from November 3 to November 7, 2021. The six-match tournament took place at the Dr. Jack Dugan Family Soccer & Track Stadium in Corpus Christi, Texas. The seven-team single-elimination tournament consisted of three rounds based on seeding from regular season conference play.  The defending champions were the Southeastern Louisiana Lions, but they were unable to defend their title falling in the Semifinals to Northwestern State 1–0.  Northwestern State went on to win the tournament, defeating Incarnate Word 1–0 in the Final.  The title was the fifth overall for the Northwestern State program, and first under head coach Stuart Gore. As tournament champions, Northwestern State earned the Southland Conference's automatic berth into the 2021 NCAA Division I Women's Soccer Tournament.

Seeding 

All seven Southland Conference teams participated in the 2021 Tournament.  Seeding was based on regular season conference records.  No tiebreakers were required as each team finished with a unique number of points in conference play.

Bracket

Source:

Schedule

First Round

Semifinals

Final

Statistics

Goalscorers

All-Tournament team

Source: 

MVP in bold

References 

 
Southland Conference Women's Soccer Tournament